George Edward Connell,  (June 20, 1930 – March 13, 2015) was a Canadian academic.

Born in Saskatoon, Saskatchewan, Connell studied at Upper Canada College in Toronto and graduated in 1947.  He then attended the University of Toronto, earning a BA in biochemistry in 1951 and a PhD in 1955.

Connell worked at the University of Toronto for the next 22 years, first as a professor of biochemistry and then as the chairman of the department of biochemistry. His research included the study of plasma cholinesterase. He left to serve as President of the University of Western Ontario from 1977 to 1984, before returning to the University of Toronto to become its twelfth President from 1984 to 1990.

In 1987, Connell was made an Officer of the Order of Canada. He served as a principal advisor to the Royal Commission of Inquiry on the Blood System in Canada (known as the Krever Inquiry) established in 1993.  Connell died on March 13, 2015.

References

External links
 

George Edward Connell archival papers held at the University of Toronto Archives and Records Management Services
From the Ivory Tower to the Corporate Tower, speech at the Empire Club of Canada, October 17, 1985 by Harry T. Seymour
Bayer International Bioethics Advisory Council, short biography

1930 births
2015 deaths
Canadian Anglicans
Canadian biochemists
Fellows of the Royal Society of Canada
Officers of the Order of Canada
Presidents of the University of Toronto
People from Saskatoon
University of Toronto alumni
Academic staff of the University of Toronto
Presidents of the University of Western Ontario
Upper Canada College alumni